Ini Oru Sudhanthiram (Freedom Now) is a 1987 Indian Tamil-language political drama film written and directed by Manivannan. The film, starring Sivakumar, was released on 12 June 1987, and failed at the box office.

Plot 

Sundaramoorthy is an Indian liberal leader. He tries to obtain his pension money, but all his attempts are futile. His daughter Kannamma gets cheated by a collector and she gives birth to a baby but the collector avoids that baby. The collector is killed by Sundaramoorthy, who is sentenced to death. How the lives of such a leader and his family changes due to circumstances, forms the crux of the story.

Cast 
 Sivakumar as Sundaramoorthy
 Chandrasekhar as Muthukaalai
 Pandiyan
 Raja as the collector
 Janagaraj
 Senthil
 Nalini
 Rekha as Kannamma
 Jeevitha
 Kovai Sarala
 Sulakshana
 Sathyaraj as an IPS officer

Production 
Ini Oru Sudhanthiram, directed by Manivannan, was Sivakumar's 154th film as an actor. Raja played a character with negative shades, in contrast to the softer roles he was known for at the time.

Soundtrack 
The soundtrack was composed by Gangai Amaran, who also wrote the lyrics. His sons Venkat Prabhu and Premgi Amaren contributed as singers, using the names "Prabhu Gangai Amaran" and "Prem Gangai Amaran", respectively.

References

External links 

1980s political drama films
1980s Tamil-language films
Films directed by Manivannan
Films scored by Gangai Amaran
Indian political drama films